The Georgia Law Review  is the flagship publication of the University of Georgia School of Law. It was established in 1966 and is run by second- and third-year law students, operating independently from the School of Law faculty and administration.

History 
Efforts to start a student-run law review at the University of Georgia go back to at least 1948 when two proposals were submitted but rejected by law school Dean J. Alton Hosch largely on financial grounds.  Dean Hosch was dismissive of similar efforts in 1960 and 1963 citing his belief that there were already too many law reviews.  Following Hosch's retirement in 1964, a successful effort to organize a law review was undertaken and the first issue was published in the Fall of 1966.

Notable people
Sally Yates served as the executive editor.

References

American law journals
Publications established in 1966
Quarterly journals
Law journals edited by students
General law journals
University of Georgia